The 2022–23 season was the 88th season in the existence of U.S. Catanzaro 1929 and the club's fifth consecutive season of the Serie C since its restructuring in 2017. In addition to the domestic league, Catanzaro participated in this season's edition of the Coppa Italia for the 46th time as well as the 2022–23 Coppa Italia Serie C for the 31st time.

Squad

Transfers

Transfers in 

 Notes

Transfers out

Pre-season and friendlies

Competitions

Overall record

Serie C

League table

Results summary

Results by round

Matches

Coppa Italia

Coppa Italia Serie C

References

U.S. Catanzaro 1929 seasons
Catanzaro